Mohamed Shafeek Rajabdeen is a Sri Lankan politician and a former member of the Parliament of Sri Lanka.

References
 

1954 births
Living people
Members of the 13th Parliament of Sri Lanka
Members of the Western Provincial Council
Sri Lanka Muslim Congress politicians
Sri Lankan Moor politicians
Sri Lankan Muslims